The 23rd Fangoria Chainsaw Awards is an award ceremony presented for horror films that were released in 2020. The nominees were announced on January 20, 2021. The film The Invisible Man won five of its five nominations, including Best Wide Release, as well as the write-in poll of Best Kill. Color Out Of Space and Possessor each took two awards. His House did not win any of its seven nominations. The ceremony was exclusively livestreamed for the first time on the SHUDDER horror streaming service.

Winners and nominees

References

Fangoria Chainsaw Awards